Polonnaruwa–Pagan War was a successful military expedition led-by Sinhalese king Parakramabahu the Great against the Pagan Kingdom between 1165 and 1181. It occurred as a result of a trade dispute between the two states.

Background
Diplomatic and cultural relations with Burma and Polonnaruwa existed long since the rise of the Burmese Pagan dynasty in the 9th century. After the Chola conquest of Anuradhapura, Sri Lanka experienced a decline in Buddhism and Vijayabahu I, who was the monarch of Polonnaruwa during the time, requested Buddhist monks from Pagan Burma to restore the Sangha in Sri Lanka. Historical chronicles state that king Vijayabahu also offered the Thihoshin Pagoda to Pagan king Alaungsithu in the 11th century, which is now still in the region of Pakkoku in modern Burma.

However the friendly relations with Pagan got disrupted with the accession of Narathu to the Burmese throne. Narathu claimed the throne by assassinating Alaungsithu, and he was quite unfavored among the Burmese people. Hostilities with the Khmers and Burma too further changed the pleasant situation between the two countries.

Narathu deprived the envoys of the King of Polonnaruwa, which caused tension between the Sinhalese and Burmese ruler, and thus Parakkamabahu I dispatched a naval fleet to conduct a military raid.

First Invasion of Burma (1164-1165) 

A fleet was collected at the port of Paluvak-tota, perhaps Palvakki on the coast north of Trincomalee; it set sail in the south-west monsoon. The army's size is unknown, but it is recorded as containing a year's supply of grains, specially modified arrows, and Sri Lanka's fearsome war elephants. Despite setbacks en route, including the sinking of one ship and the loss of a few others, the army arrived at the city of Kusumiya (modern Pathein) on the banks of the Bago river, and captured it. Thereafter, the armies are said to have captured several other cities, including Arimaddhanapura. 

The Sinhalese assassinated Narathu, and the Burmese facing their defeat requested the Burmese Sangha to resolve the situation, and thus the raid was ended with a peace treaty between the Burmese and Sinhalese Buddhist Sangha.

Second Invasion of Burma (1180-1181) 
A retaliatory raid is also thought to have launched by Parakramabahu in 1180, after Narapatisithu, the successor of Narathu imprisoned Sinhalese envoys, tradesmen, and a princess on her way to the Khmer Empire. The tensions and wars between Polonnaruwa and Pagan then ended with a peace agreement in 1181.

References

External links
 https://www.ft.lk/columns/the-first-navy-the-nation-raised/4-125438
 http://books.lakdiva.org/codrington/chap04.html

Polonnaruwa period
Wars involving Sri Lanka
Military history of Sri Lanka
Wars involving Myanmar
Wars involving Cambodia